SLIM-Kantar Peoples Awards  is an award given to distinguished individuals involved with Sri Lanka's media brands and personalities each year. It is the joint work of Sri Lanka Institute of Marketing (SLIM) with Kantar Group ,UK. The awards show is one of the most popular marketing program events in Sri Lanka. 

The awardees are chosen solely by people's votes, through research conducted by Nielsen Sri Lanka. The awards were first introduced in 2006 and continued without interruptions.

History
Established in 2006 the concept was started by Nielsen Company. Awardees are chosen by vote, through comprehensive nationwide research. The first survey spanned a period of one year. Randomly-selected males and females between the ages of 18 and 50 years were interviewed in all 25 districts.

Awards 
The awards are distributed across 45 different categories of media, marketing, banking, telecommunication, sports, drama and singing. In 2018, Fashion Retail Brand and FMCG Retail Brand of the Year were added.

Categories

 People’s Brand of the Year
 Durable Brand of the Year
 Housing and Construction Brand of the Year
 FMCG Brand of the Year
 Personal Care Brand of the Year
 Household Care Brand of the Year
 Beverage Brand of the Year
 Hot Beverage Brand of the Year
 Food Brand of the Year
 Service Brand Of The Year
 Telecom Service Provider of the Year
 Internet Service Provider of the Year
 Banking Service Provider of the Year
 Financial Service Provider of the Year
 Life Insurance Service Provider of the Year
 General Insurance Service Provider of the Year
 Television Chanel of the Year
 Radio Chanel of the Year
 People's News Provider of the  Year
 News Paper of the Year
 Advertisement of the Year
 Film of the Year
 Teledrama of the Year
 Television Program of the Year
 People's Song of the Year
 Radio Program of the Year
 Male and Female Singer of the Year
 Actor and Actress of the Year
 Sports Person of the Year
 Tele-Drama Actor and Actress of the Year
 Television Presenter of the Year
 Radio Presenter of the Year
 Fashion Retail Brand of the Year
 FMCG Retail Brand of the Year
 Youth Brand of the Year
 Youth FMCG Brand of the Year
 Youth Beverage Brand of the Year
 Youth Food Brand of the Year
 Youth Television Channel of the Year
 Youth Radio Station of the Year
 Youth Actor and Actress of the Year

Ceremonies

 2017 – The 11th Awards ceremony was held on 10 March 2017, at Waters Edge.
 2018 – The 12th Awards ceremony was held on 9 March 2018, at Waters Edge.
 2021 - The 15th Awards ceremony was held on 23 March 2021, at BMICH.
 2022 - The 16th Awards ceremony was held on 21 March 2022, at Monarch Imperial

Awardees

Chathura Alwis, Best Television Presenter in 2018, 2019, and 2020

References

Sri Lankan awards